J. W. Holliday Jr. House is a historic home located at Conway in Horry County, South Carolina. It was built in 1910, and is a two-story, rectangular, side-gable, frame, weatherboard-clad residence.  It is dominated by a pedimented Beaux-Arts style portico with giant paired Ionic order columns.

It was listed on the National Register of Historic Places in 1986.

References

External links
Holliday, J. W., Jr., House - Conway, South Carolina - U.S. National Register of Historic Places on Waymarking.com

Houses on the National Register of Historic Places in South Carolina
Beaux-Arts architecture in South Carolina
Houses completed in 1910
Houses in Horry County, South Carolina
National Register of Historic Places in Horry County, South Carolina
Buildings and structures in Conway, South Carolina
1910 establishments in South Carolina